Mashobra is a town in Shimla district of Himachal Pradesh. It is connected to the state capital Shimla (erstwhile Simla) through the historic Hindustan–Tibet Road built in 1850 by Lord Dalhousie.

Geography
It has an average elevation of 2,146 metres (7,041 feet).

Retreat
Mashobra is notable for housing one of the two Presidential retreats in India.  The other retreat is Rashtrapati Nilayam in Secunderabad.

The president visits Mashobra at least once every year, and during this time his or her core office shifts to the retreat at Chharabra, in the vicinity of Mashobra.  The building housing the retreat is a completely wooden structure originally constructed in 1850.

In May 1948, before returning to London at the end of his mission as viceroy and then governor general of India, Lord Mountbatten and his wife Lady Edwina spent a few weeks in this retreat. The then Prime Minister Jawaharlal Nehru paid them a visit, which is documented in the biographies of Lady Mountbatten.

Other places of interest 
Mashobra is also a tourist destination. 

Wildflower Hall at Chharabra, now a property of Oberoi Hotels, has been residence to Lord Kitchener as well as Lord Ripon during the British Raj.

At 3 km from Mashobra is Carignano, a picnic spot that was a villa of Chevalier Federico Peliti, an Italian photographer in India from the times of Queen Victoria, who named it in honor of his native town Carignano near Turin in Italy. The villa was transformed to a weekend resort in 1920 and is also referred to in one of the novels by Anita Desai.

Pankaj Mishra is a writer/poet who lives in Mashobra.

Amit Khanna, film maker, poet, writer and media guru has a cottage in Mashobra where he spends several weeks every year working on his new book.

Like Amit, Navtej Sarna, well known diplomat and author, is also a part time resident of Puranikoti village near Mashobra.

Flora and fauna 

Mashobra is part of Shimla Water Catchment and Wildlife Sanctuary. The natural vegetation comprises pine, oak, cedar or Himalayan deodar, and rhododendron, as well as maple and horse chestnut.  The wildlife consists of monkeys, Langurs, jackals, kakkar (barking deer), and the occasional leopard, as well as numerous bird species such as the Himalayan eagle, pheasants, chikor and partridges.

Educational Institution 
Himalayan International School at Chharabra is a major residential school in Mashobra.

References 

Tourist attractions in Shimla